Elle (stylized in all caps) is a worldwide women's magazine of French origin that offers a mix of fashion and beauty content, together with culture, society and lifestyle. The title means "she" or "her" in French. Elle is considered one of the world's largest fashion magazines, with 45 editions around the world and 46 local websites. It now counts 21 million readers and 100 million unique visitors per month, with an audience of mostly women. It was founded in Paris in 1945 by Hélène Gordon-Lazareff and her husband, the writer Pierre Lazareff. The magazine's readership has continuously grown since its founding, increasing to 800,000 across France by the 1960s. Elle editions have since multiplied, creating a global network of publications and readers. Elle'''s Japanese publication was launched in 1969, beginning an international expansion. Its first issues in English (US and UK) were launched in 1985.

Previous editors of the magazine include Jean-Dominique Bauby, well known for his memoir, and Roberta Myers, the longest-serving editor-in-chief at Elle. Nina Garcia currently holds the position of editor-in-chief at Elle, appointed after the departure of Myers.

Along with the magazine, the Elle brand includes 33 websites that stretch globally and receive 370 million monthly views. The Lagardère Group of France owns the brand. The official Elle headquarters is located in Paris, with licensed publishers located in many other cities.

 History Elle was founded in Paris as an immediate aftermath of World War II and first sold as a supplement to France-Soir, edited at the time by Pierre Lazareff.  Hélène Gordon-Lazareff, Elles pioneering founder, returned to Paris from New York City to create a unique publication that grappled with the many forces shaping the lives of women in France in 1945. Women won the right to vote in 1944, and Elle dove immediately into long-form "newspaper-like" features on women's role in national politics and the growing feminist movement. In the Elle articles featuring rising fashion designers, the magazine would provide free patterns of some of their fashion pieces. This allowed the general public to experience haute couture as the glamor of the fashion world was becoming accessible to the common working class.

Its 100th issue, published on 14 October 1947, featured the work of Christian Dior just eight months after his debut show. Likewise, Brigitte Bardot had her first Elle cover at age 17, on 7 January 1952, months before her screen debut in Manina, the Girl in the Bikini. By the 1960s, Elle had a readership of 800,000 across France and was said to "not so much reflect fashion as decree it." This dominance was reflected in the famous slogan: "Si elle lit, elle lit Elle" 'If she reads, she reads Elle.

Lagardère Group subsidiary, Hachette Filipacchi Médias began pushing Elle outside of Europe in 1969, launching its Japanese publication. In 1985, Elle launched in Britain and the United States. The Chinese version of the magazine was first published in 1988. It was the first four-color fashion magazine offered in China. The magazine was used as an informational and educational tool for opening of the Chinese textile market. By 1991, the magazine's sales were in decline in the U.S.

In 1989, Hachette Filipacchi Media U.S. launched Elle Decor magazine, focusing on home decor. Elle.com was launched in 2007.

In 2011, The Hearst Corporation reached a €651M deal with Lagardère to purchase the rights to publish Elle Magazine in fifteen countries including the United Kingdom, Italy, Spain, Russia and Ukraine. Lagardère, which struggled in the international market in the 2000s, retained the rights to the French edition and would collect royalties from the international editions.Elle Brazil was the first commercial magazine in the world to have a transgender model on its cover, with Lea T. in December 2011. The Brazilian edition had also discovered transgender model Valentina Sampaio and had put her on the cover before French Vogue. Elle printed special collectors' covers for their September 2016 issue, and one of them featured Hari Nef, which was the first time an openly transgender woman had been on the cover of a major commercial British magazine.

In 2019, Lagardère sold Elle France to Czech Media Invest, parent of Czech News Center. Lagardère continues to own the Elle brand.

 Notable editors-in-chief Elle editors have included Jean-Dominique Bauby, who became known for writing a book after suffering almost total paralysis, and Robbie Myers. In September 2017, it was announced that Roberta Myers was stepping down from the role of editor-in-chief, position she held since 2000, stating through a memo to the staff that "I want to spend the next seasons as available to my children as I can be, and so I take my leave of Elle now". A day later of the announcement, it was reported that Nina Garcia, creative director of Marie Claire was appointed as the new editor-in-chief effective 18 September. Patricia Wang was the first editor of Elle China.

 Circulation 

 Operations Elle includes region-specific editions within countries, such as Elle Hong Kong and Elle Québec which are published in addition to Elle China and Elle Canada respectively. In Belgium, Elle is published as two magazines for the Flanders and Wallonia regions, while Elle Middle East is targeted at several countries in the region. Technologically speaking, the Elle brand is a global network encompassing over 33 websites. Subscriptions account for 73 percent of readers. There are 33 Elle websites globally, which collectively attract over 25 million unique visitors and 370 million page views per month. The magazine reaches over 69 million readers. The vast majority (82 percent) of Elle's audience are women between the ages of 18 and 49. Its readers have a median age of 34.7 years. 40 percent of the readers are single, and the median household income is $69,973. "Our readers are young enough to think about life as an adventure and old enough to have the means to live it", said Roberta Myers, editor in chief.

The first international edition of Elle was launched in Japan in 1969. Its U.S. and UK editions were launched in 1985. Spain followed in 1986 with Italy and Hong Kong editions launching in 1987. In 1988, the magazine was launched in Germany, Brazil, China, Sweden, Greece and Portugal. The next year, the Netherlands and Quebec joined the international Elle community. Australia and Taiwan versions were launched in 1990, Mexico and Argentina in 1994, and a Russian edition, published monthly, launched in 1996.Elle as a brand is owned by the Lagardère Group of France. It is published in France by Czech Media Invest, in the U.S. and the UK by Hearst Magazines, in Canada by KO Média, in Brazil by Grupo Editora Abril, in Mexico by Grupo Expansión, in Argentina by Grupo Clarín, in Indonesia by Mayapada, in Singapore by Atlas Press PTE LTD., in Serbia/Croatia by Adria Media, in Turkey by Doğan Burda Magazine, in Germany by Hubert Burda Media, and in Romania by Ringier. In China, the publisher is Shanghai Translation Publishing House. In India it is published by Ogaan Publications Pvt. Ltd. As an international magazine, Elle has its headquarters in Paris as well as licensed publishers in New York City, London, Toronto, Mexico City, South Africa, Istanbul, São Paulo, Rio de Janeiro, Brussels, Lisbon, Tokyo, Warsaw, Belgrade, Oslo, Helsinki, Bucharest, Athens, Delhi, Madrid, Milan, Munich, Jakarta, Kyiv, Kuala Lumpur, Sofia, Budapest, Bangkok and other cities.

In December 2013, Elle hired Randy Minor as design director. In November 2016, Elle Canada promoted Vanessa Craft to editor-in-chief, making her the first black woman at the helm of an Elle magazine globally.

In mid-July 2020, Elle Australian publisher Bauer Media Australia and New Zealand, which had been acquired by Mercury Capital, terminated the magazine's Australian edition, citing declining advertising revenue and travel restrictions associated with the COVID-19 pandemic. As of 2021, Elle'' is being published by Are Media, the successor to Bauer Media Australia.

At the end of 2021, ELLE announced that all global editions would ban fur from their pages as of Jan. 1, 2023, citing "a really great opportunity to increase awareness for animal welfare, bolster the demand for sustainable and innovative alternatives and foster a more humane fashion industry." In recent years a number of fashion houses and retailers have discontinued the use of animal fur and skin in their products due to pressure from animal rights groups who are calling for more cruelty-free clothing options and changing tastes from younger, ethically-minded customers.

Editors 

 Nina Garcia (US)
 Erin Doherty (France)
 Kenya Hunt (UK)
 Gloria Lam (HK)
 Genevra Leek (Australia)
 Graciela Maya (Argentina)
 Kamna Malik (India)
 Taru Marjamaa (Finland)
 Xiao Xue (China)
 Melda Narmanlı Çimen (Turkey)
 Sandra Gato (Portugal)
 Joanie Pietracupa (Canada)
 Vanessa Craft (Canada)
 Caroline Suganda (Singapore)
 Soraya Vattanajiamwong (Thailand)
 Cecilie Christiansen (Denmark)
 Sonya Zabouga (Ukraine)
 Barbara Sekirnik (Slovenia)
 Ruben William Steven (Indonesia)
 Karina Iskakova (Kazakhstan)
 Sonja Kovacs (Serbia)
 Kelly Fung (South Africa)
 Thuy Linh Nguyen (Vietnam)
 Roxana Voloseniuc (Romania)
 Vladimira Mirković-Blažević (Croatia)
 Benedetta Poletti  (Spain)
 Marta Drożdż (Poland)
 Maria Georgieva  (Bulgaria)
 Susana Barbosa (Brazil)
 Andrea Behounkova (Czech Republic)
 Danda Santini (Italy)
 Julia Juyeon Kang (Korea)
 Kate Guest (Malaysia) - not in charge anymore (2022)
 Sabine Nedelchev (Germany)
 Kanako Sakai (Japan)
 Flora Tzimaka (Greece)
 Signy Fardal (Norway)
 Florence Lu (Taiwan)
 Maria Aziz (Middle East)
 Claudia Cándano (Mexico)
 Cia Jansson (Sweden)
 Nica Broucke (Flanders, Belgium)
 Béa Ercolini (Wallonia, Belgium)
 Anke de Jong (Holland)

See also 

 List of fashion magazines
 List of women's magazines
 Didier Guérin, executive in charge of new releases
 :Category:Elle (magazine) writers

References

External links 

  
 

1945 establishments in France
Are Media
 
Hearst Communications publications
Lagardère Active
Magazines published in Paris
Magazines established in 1945
Monthly magazines published in France
Multilingual magazines
Weekly magazines published in France
Women's magazines published in France
Women's fashion magazines